William Thomas Miller (1865 – 6 October 1930) was a Northern Irish Unionist politician.

A farmer he was born in Newtownstewart in 1865. He was educated at the Model School, Newtownstewart; and the Intermediate School, Newtownstewart; and the Methodist College Belfast. He was a member of Strabane Rural District Council and of Tyrone County Council.

He unsuccessfully contested the North West Tyrone constituency in the 1918 United Kingdom general election, losing to Sinn Féin's	Arthur Griffith.
In 1921, he was elected to House of Commons of Northern Ireland for the constituency of Fermanagh and Tyrone, and was re-elected in 1925. In 1929, he was elected for the constituency of North Tyrone. He died in 1930 and at the subsequent by-election James Gamble was elected unopposed.

References

1865 births
1930 deaths
People from County Tyrone
Members of Tyrone County Council
Farmers from Northern Ireland
Members of the House of Commons of Northern Ireland 1921–1925
Members of the House of Commons of Northern Ireland 1925–1929
Members of the House of Commons of Northern Ireland 1929–1933
Members of the House of Commons of Northern Ireland for Fermanagh and Tyrone
Members of the House of Commons of Northern Ireland for County Tyrone constituencies
Ulster Unionist Party members of the House of Commons of Northern Ireland